Neville Langford-Smith (born Sydney 1910, died Castle Hill 1993) was an Anglican bishop in Kenya.

Langford-Smith was educated at Trinity Grammar School and the University of Sydney. In 1932 he went as a volunteer to Central Tanganyika. In 1937 he became a missionary with the CMS. After ordination he became headmaster of the Boys School in Dodoma. He was then in charge of the Teachers Training College in Marangu. In 1949 he went to Kenya as supervisor of schools in tKikuyu. He became an Archdeacon in 1955; and in 1961 he was appointed the first Bishop of Nakuru.

He retired in 1975, subsequently returning to Sydney, where he served at Christ Church, St Ives.

He died on 26 October 1993.

References

1910 births
Clergy from Sydney
1993 deaths
People educated at Trinity Grammar School (New South Wales)
University of Sydney alumni
20th-century Anglican bishops of the Anglican Church of Kenya
Anglican bishops of Nakuru